Nakhodka is a port city in Primorsky Krai, Russia, located on the Trudny Peninsula jutting into the Nakhodka Bay of the Sea of Japan, about  east of Vladivostok, the administrative center of the krai. Population:

History

The Nakhodka Bay, around which the city is organized, was first known to the Russians on the corvette Amerika, which sought shelter in the bay during a storm in 1859. In honor of this occasion, the ice-free and relatively calm bay was named Nakhodka, which in Russian means "discovery" or "lucky find".

An imperial settlement existed here from 1868 to 1872 but was abandoned following the death of its administrator, Harold Furuhjelm. In the fall of 1870, Otto Wilhelm Lindholm established a whaling station across the bay from the settlement. In the spring of 1871 he fitted out his schooner Hannah Rice and sailed to Posyet, where he caught six gray whales.

Until the 20th century, the area around the bay remained uninhabited, with the first settlement a small fishing village founded in 1907. When the Soviet government decided to build a harbor in the area in the 1930s, a number of small settlements were founded, which were merged as a work settlement in the 1940s. On May 18, 1950, the settlement, by then with a population of about 28,000 residents, was granted town status.

Administrative and municipal status
Within the framework of administrative divisions, it is, together with three rural localities, incorporated as Nakhodka City Under Krai Jurisdiction—an administrative unit with the status equal to that of the districts. As a municipal division, Nakhodka City Under Krai Jurisdiction is incorporated as Nakhodkinsky Urban Okrug.

Climate
Nakhodka has one of the mildest climates in Primorsky Krai and in the whole of the Asian part of Russia thanks to its southerly location and oceanic influences from the Sea of Japan. It is classified as a humid continental climate (Köppen climate classification Dfb) due to the vast seasonal differences and is a very cold climate for a coastal location below 43 degrees latitude. The maritime influence is manifested in low diurnal temperature variation and a vast summer seasonal lag. Due to the influence of the interior, there is a sharp drop in temperatures between October and November. Half of the year has mean temperatures above , in spite of the warmest month being only moderately warm and the coldest month having quite severe cold, with a very low seasonal lag in winter.

Economy and infrastructure

The city's economy, based mostly around the port and port-related activity such as fish processing and canning, has suffered since 1991 as Vladivostok was opened to foreign activity again. Local industry also took a hit during the 1998 Russian financial crisis. However, Nakhodka has been declared a free economic zone, and the governments in both Moscow (federal) and Vladivostok (regional) have seemed interested in opening the city further to foreign investment.

Nakhodka is also an important transport junction where goods from Japan are transferred from ships onto the Russian railway system, including the Trans-Siberian Railway portion of the Eurasian Land Bridge.

Vostochny Port, the largest stevedoring company in the country, is headquartered in the city.

Sports
FC Okean Nakhodka was the only professional sport club in the city. It spent the 1992 and 1993 seasons in the Russian Premier League, although the club later folded and was refounded in the amateur leagues. It is also the home town of association football player Viktor Fayzulin.

Twin towns and sister cities

Nakhodka has the following sister city relationships:

First Soviet Union-Japan sister city

References

Notes

Sources

 
Port cities and towns in Russia
Seaside resorts in Russia
Ports and harbours of the Russian Pacific Coast
Populated coastal places in Russia